Bemni is an isolated village in the Himalayas of northern India. It is located in Chamoli district in the state of Uttarakhand. The village had a population of 990 in 2003.

Details
As of 2003, Bemni had no paved road into town. People had to walk uphill to reach the isolated village. There was no electricity or telecommunication infrastructure, and schooling stopped at grade five. This situation was addressed in recent years with the building of a road and new schools; and the installation of electricity and telecommunication towers. The major crops in the area are pulses, barley, wheat, and hay. The fields in which these crops are grown are carved out of the mountainside, using cattle pulling wooden ploughs, and then harvested by hand with the use of sickles.

References

External links
 

Villages in Chamoli district